Howard Duncan Hughes (born April 4, 1939) is a Canadian former professional ice hockey forward who played 168 games in the National Hockey League for the Los Angeles Kings.

Awards and achievements
Turnbull Cup MJHL Championship (1958)
Memorial Cup Championship (1959)
WHL Second All-Star Team (1967)
WHL Championship (1967)
WHL First All-Star Team (1974)
"Honoured Member" of the Manitoba Hockey Hall of Fame

External links

Howie Hughes's biography at Manitoba Hockey Hall of Fame

1939 births
Living people
Canadian ice hockey forwards
Los Angeles Kings players
People from Saint Boniface, Winnipeg
St. Boniface Canadiens players
Ice hockey people from Winnipeg
Winnipeg Braves players
Winnipeg Warriors (minor pro) players